Life is a 2018 South Korean television series written by  and directed by , starring Lee Dong-wook, Cho Seung-woo, Won Jin-ah, Lee Kyu-hyung, Yoo Jae-myung and Moon So-ri. The series aired on JTBC from July 23 to September 11, 2018 and is also available for streaming on Netflix.

Synopsis
At one of South Korea's top medical centers, ideals and interests collide between a patient-centered emergency medicine doctor and the hospital's newly-appointed CEO.

Cast

Main
 Lee Dong-wook as Ye Jin-woo
Choi Ro-woon as young Ye Jin-woo
An emergency medicine specialist.
 Cho Seung-woo as Koo Seung-hyo
CEO of Sangkook University Hospital.
 Won Jin-ah as Lee No-eul
A junior pediatric specialist.
 Lee Kyu-hyung as Ye Seon-woo
 Kim Yeon-ung as young Ye Seon-woo
Judge at the Health Insurance Review & Assessment Service and an orthopedic specialist. Ye Jin-woo's brother.
 Yoo Jae-myung as Joo Kyung-moon
Chief of the Cardiothoracic Surgery Department.
 Moon So-ri as Oh Se-hwa
Chief of the Neurosurgery Department and the Director of Sangkook University Hospital.

Recurring
 Moon Sung-keun as Kim Tae-sang
 Chief of the Orthopedic Surgery Department and the Deputy Director of Sangkook University Hospital.
 Chun Ho-jin as Lee Bo-hoon
A psychiatrist and the former Director of Sangkook University Hospital.
 Tae In-ho as Sunwoo Chang
A coordinator at the Transplant Center.
 Yeom Hye-ran as Kang Kyung-ah 
 Manager of Sangkook University Hospital.
 Choi Yu-hwa as Choi Seo-hyun
A reporter for the online newspaper Saegeul21.
 Um Hyo-sup as Lee Sang-yeop
Chief of the Cancer Center and former Deputy Director of Sangkook University Hospital.
 Kim Won-hae as Lee Dong-soo
Chief of the Emergency Department.
 Jung Moon-sung as Jo Nam-hyung
Chairman of Hwajeong Group.
  as Jang Min-ki
Chief of the Transplant Center.
 Woo Mi-hwa as Kim Jung-hee
Chief of the Obstetrics & Gynaecology Department.
 Park Min-gwan as Ko Young-jae
Chief of the Pediatric Surgery Department.
 Jung Hee-tae as Seo Ji-yong
Chief of the Ophthalmology Department.
  as Kang Yoon-mo
Chief of the Plastic Surgery Department.
 Hwang In-joon as Choi Young-jin
 An anesthesiologist.
  as Lee Hyeon-gyun
 Director of the Restructuring Team at Sangkook University Hospital.
 Lee Sang-hee as Kim Eun-ha
A nurse at the Emergency Department.
  as Ahn Hyun-i
A nurse at the Emergency Department.
  as Park Jae-hyuk 
An emergency medicine resident.

Extended
 Oh Hye-won as Mr. Jung
A member of the Health Insurance and Assessment Committee.
 Yoo In-soo as Choi Woo-jin
A resident at the Cancer Center.
 Park Ji-yeon as  Lee So-jung
A nurse at the Cardiothoracic Surgery Department.
 Nam Gi-ae as the mother of Jin-woo and Sun-woo

Production
The first script reading was held on March 29, 2018 at the JTBC building, in Sangam-dong, Seoul, South Korea.

Original soundtrack

Part 1

Part 2

Part 3

Part 4

Part 5

Part 6

Viewership

Awards and nominations

References

External links
  
 
 
 

2018 South Korean television series debuts
South Korean medical television series
Television series by Signal Entertainment Group
JTBC television dramas
2018 South Korean television series endings
Korean-language Netflix exclusive international distribution programming